Rock County is a county in the U.S. state of Wisconsin. As of the 2020 census, the population was 163,687.  Its county seat is Janesville. Rock County comprises the Janesville-Beloit, WI Metropolitan Statistical Area and is included in the Madison-Janesville-Beloit, WI Combined Statistical Area.

History
Rock County was created as a territorial county on December 7, 1836, from Milwaukee County and fully organized February 19, 1839. The county is named for the Rock River, which bisects the county from north to south.

Geography

Cook Memorial Arboretum, a natural area with birding and nature trails, is located northwest of Janesville. It is owned by the Janesville School District.

Transportation

Major highways

  Interstate 39
  Interstate 43
  Interstate 90
  U.S. Highway 12
  U.S. Highway 14
  U.S. Highway 51
  Highway 11
  Highway 26
  Highway 59
  Highway 67
  Highway 81
  Highway 89
  Highway 104
  Highway 140
  Highway 213

Railroads
Canadian Pacific
Union Pacific
Wisconsin and Southern Railroad

Buses
Beloit Transit
Janesville Transit System
List of intercity bus stops in Wisconsin

Airport
Southern Wisconsin Regional Airport (KJVL) serves Rock County and the surrounding communities.

Adjacent counties
 Green County – west
 Dane County – north
 Jefferson County – northeast
 Walworth County – east
 Boone County, Illinois – south
 Winnebago County, Illinois – south

Demographics

As of the census of 2020, the population was 163,687. The racial makeup of the county was 81.3% White, 5.1% Black or African American, 1.3% Asian, 0.5% Native American, 4.6% from other races, and 7.2% from two or more races. Ethnically, the population was 9.7% Hispanic or Latino of any race.

As of the census of 2010, there were 160,331 people residing in the county. 

As of the census of 2000, were 152,307 people, 58,617 households, and 40,387 families residing in the county. The population density was 211 people per square mile (82/km2). there were 62,187 housing units at an average density of 86 per square mile (33/km2). The racial makeup of the county was 91.01% white, 4.63% black or African American, 0.28% Native American, 0.78% Asian, 0.04% Pacific Islander, 1.77% from other races, and 1.50% from two or more races. 3.91% of the population were Hispanic or Latino of any race. 32.8% were of German, 13.0% Norwegian, 10.1% Irish, 7.5% English and 5.5% American ancestry.

There were 58,617 households, out of which 33.60% had children under the age of 18 living with them, 53.50% were married couples living together, 10.90% had a female householder with no husband present, and 31.10% were non-families. 25.10% of all households were made up of individuals, and 9.70% had someone living alone who was 65 years of age or older. The average household size was 2.54 and the average family size was 3.03.

In the county, the population was spread out, with 26.50% under the age of 18, 8.60% from 18 to 24, 29.80% from 25 to 44, 22.30% from 45 to 64, and 12.70% who were 65 years of age or older. The median age was 36 years. For every 100 females there were 97.00 males. For every 100 females age 18 and over, there were 94.10 males.

Communities

Cities
 Beloit
 Brodhead (mostly in Green County)
 Edgerton (partly in Dane County)
 Evansville
 Janesville (County seat)
 Milton

Villages
 Clinton
 Orfordville
 Footville

Towns

 Avon
 Beloit
 Bradford
 Center
 Clinton
 Fulton
 Harmony
 Janesville
 Johnstown
 La Prairie
 Lima
 Magnolia
 Milton
 Newark
 Plymouth
 Porter
 Rock
 Spring Valley
 Turtle
 Union

Census-designated places
 Fulton
 Hanover
 Shopiere

Unincorporated communities

 Afton
 Anderson
 Avalon
 Avon
 Belcrest
 Bergen
 Cainville
 Center
 Charlie Bluff
 Cooksville
 Coopers Shores
 Crestview
 Emerald Grove
 Fairfield (partial)
 Foxhollow
 Indianford
 Johnstown
 Johnstown Center
 Koshkonong (partial)
 Leyden
 Lima Center
 Magnolia
 Mallwood
 Maple Beach
 Newark
 Newville
 Porters
 Stebbinsville
 Tiffany
 Union
 Victory Heights

Ghost towns/neighborhoods
 Fellows
 Jefferson Prairie Settlement

Politics
Hillary Clinton carried the county in 2016, but it was the smallest margin of victory since Michael Dukakis in 1988.

Education
School districts include:

 Albany School District
 Beloit School District
 Beloit Turner School District
 Brodhead School District
 Clinton Community School District
 Delavan-Darien School District
 Edgerton School District
 Evansville Community School District
 Fort Atkinson School District
 Janesville School District
 Milton School District
 Oregon School District
 Parkview School District
 Stoughton Area School District
 Whitewater School District

There is a state-operated school, Wisconsin School for the Blind and Visually Impaired.

Tree cities
 Beloit
 Clinton
 Edgerton
 Evansville
 Janesville

See also
 National Register of Historic Places listings in Rock County, Wisconsin

References

Further reading
 Brown, William F. Rock County, Wisconsin: A New History... Vol. 1, Chicago: Cooper, 1908.
 Brown, William F. Rock County, Wisconsin: A New History... Vol. 2, Chicago: Cooper, 1908.
 Commemorative Biographical Record of the Counties of Rock, Green, Grant, Iowa, and Lafayette, Wisconsin, Containing Biographical Sketches of Prominent and Representative Citizens, and of Many of the Early Settled Families. Chicago: J. H. Beers and Co., 1901.
 The History of Rock County, Wisconsin. Chicago: Western Historical Company, 1879.
 Portrait and Biographical Album of Rock County, Wisconsin. Chicago: Acme Publishing Company, 1889.
 Sayre, David F. "Early Life in Southern Wisconsin", Wisconsin Magazine of History, vol. 3, no. 4 (June 1920), pp. 420–427.
 Smith, Isaac T. "Early Settlement of Rock County" in Wisconsin Historical Collections, vol. VI. Madison, Wis.: Atwood & Culver, 1872, pp. 416–425.
 Walterman, Thomas. There Stands "Old Rock": Rock County, Wisconsin and the War to Preserve the Union. Friendship, Wis.: New Past Press, 2001.

External links
 Rock County government website
 Rock County map from the Wisconsin Department of Transportation
 Rock County 5.0
 Rock County Historical Society
 Rock County Genealogical Society
 Beloit Janesville Symphony

 
1839 establishments in Wisconsin Territory
Populated places established in 1839